"De Revolutie" was the last single from Flemish/Dutch girl group K3 with first blonde member Kathleen Aerts. It was written by Miquel Wiels,  A. Putte, P. Gillis, and produced by Studio 100. The song premiered in 2008 in their 10th anniversary show. The song was supposed to be the leading single of their tenth album, but the album did not make it because Kathleen wanted to quit K3. However, a year later, when Josje Huisman was chosen to replace Kathleen, the song was rerecorded and put on the tenth album MaMaSé!.

The song was a huge hit in Belgium & the Netherlands. It peaked at #14 in Netherlands.

Music video
Originally the music video was a dance video with the 3 girls wearing pink and dancing with kids. But later it was a concert video from their 10th anniversary show.

References

 http://www.glandigomusic.com/info.php?bundle_id=129949
 https://www.youtube.com/watch?v=sWraddBIKfA

2008 singles
2008 songs